The Guards 100 was a European Formula Two race held on 23 March 1967 at the Snetterton Circuit in  Thetford, England.

Results

Heat 1

Heat 2

Final

''Note: Pink background denotes graded drivers ineligible for championship points

References

External links 

 

Formula Two races
European Formula two season